Motandra is a genus of plant in the family Apocynaceae native to tropical Africa.  the World Checklist of Selected Plant Families recognises 3 species:

Species
 Motandra guineensis (Thonn.) A.DC. - widespread from Liberia to Sudan and south to Angola
 Motandra lujae De Wild. & T.Durand - Gabon, Congo, Cabinda, Equatorial Guinea, Zaire 
 Motandra poecilophylla Wernham - Gabon, Congo, Equatorial Guinea, Cameroon

formerly included
 Motandra erlangeri K.Schum = Oncinotis tenuiloba Stapf
 Motandra glabrata Baill. = Oncinotis glabrata (Baill.) Stapf ex Hiern
 Motandra viridiflora K.Schum. = Baissea viridiflora (K.Schum.) de Kruif
 Motandra welwitschiana Baill. = Oncinotis hirta Oliv.

References

 
Apocynaceae genera
Flora of Africa